Rani Mangammal (Mangamma)(died 1705) was a queen regent of the Madurai Nayak kingdom (in present-day Madurai, India) during the minority of her grandson Vijaya Ranga Chokkanatha in 1689—1704. She was a popular administrator and is still widely remembered as a maker of roads and avenues, and a builder of temples, tanks and choultries with many of her public works still in use. She is also known for her diplomatic and political skills and successful military campaigns. The capital of Madurai Kingdom during her times was Tiruchy.

Life 

Mangammal was the daughter of Tupakula Lingama Nayaka,and was the wife of a general of Madurai ruler Chokkanatha Nayak (1659–1682). She married Chokkanatha Nayak and became the mother of Rangakrishna Muthu Virappa Nayak (1682—1689). 

When her husband died in 1682, he was succeeded by her son. Upon the death of her son in 1689, her son's widow was pregnant. Her son was succeeded by her grandson in 1689. Her daughter-in-law committed sati, and Mangammal became regent during the minority of her grandson.

Regency
During Mangammal's regency, many irrigation channels were repaired, new roads were constructed, avenue trees were planted, and several municipal buildings were completed, including temples and her "Spring Palace" at TumKum. The "Spring Palace" now houses the Gandhi Memorial Museum in Madurai. The highway from Cape Comorin was originally built during the time of Mangammal and it was known as Rani Mangammal Salai.

She played a key role in assisting the Mughal Army during the Siege of Jinji (Gingee). Queen Mangammal had realized that the renegade Rajaram had entrenched himself within Jinji and had been bent upon attacking Thanjavur and Madurai if the Mughal Army were to withdraw. Mangammal soon recognized Aurangzeb and the Mughals as her allies and she began to assist Zulfiqar Khan in attacking the Jinji fort. When the fort was captured by both Zulfiqar Khan and Mangammal after 8 years, she and her family had control over the fort under the leadership of the Mughals.

When her grandson, Vijayaranga Chokkanatha Nayaka, came of age in 1704, she and her prime minister, Achayya, refused to relinquish power. They were seized by the army commander and executed.

Gallery

References

External links

 
 Madurai
 Meenakshi Temple
 Madurai.com - Rani Mangammal
 
 Tamukkam Palace at Madurai, Now Gandhi Memorial Museum

17th-century women rulers
Indian queens
1706 deaths
Telugu people
Regents of India
Madurai Nayak dynasty
17th-century births
18th-century women rulers
17th-century Indian women
17th-century Indian people
18th-century Indian women
18th-century Indian people